Albert George Harley (17 April 1940 – June 1993) was an English footballer who played as a wing half in the Football League for Shrewsbury Town, Swansea Town, Crewe Alexandra, Stockport County and Chester.

References

1940 births
1993 deaths
Sportspeople from Chester
Association football wing halves
English footballers
Shrewsbury Town F.C. players
Swansea City A.F.C. players
Crewe Alexandra F.C. players
Stockport County F.C. players
Chester City F.C. players
Connah's Quay Nomads F.C. players
English Football League players